Espoo United is a professional basketball club based in Espoo, Finland. The team is part of the multi-sports club Espoo, which also had an ice hockey section. The club was founded in 2016 and entered the first division Korisliiga in 2017.

However, despite a first season in the top tier, the club was expelled due to financial irregularities.

Season by season

References

External links
Official website (in Finnish)

Basketball teams in Finland
Basketball teams established in 2016
2016 establishments in Finland